Ousseynou Ba (born 11 November 1995) is a Senegalese professional footballer who plays as a centre-back for Greek Super League club Olympiacos.

Club career
Ba was a youth product from the Senegalese SMASH academy, before moving to Amiens in the summer of 2016. Unable to get a work permit for them, after a year of not playing Ba managed to get a work permit when he signed with Gazélec Ajaccio in June 2017. He made his professional debut for Gazélec Ajaccio in a 1–1 tie with FC Valenciennes on 28 July 2017.

In January 2019 Ba signed with the Greek club Olympiakos for an undisclosed fee, but it is decided to play till the end of the season in Ajaccio. His first appearance came against Lamia on 28 September 2019. During the 2019–20 season, Avraam Papadopoulos’ injuries along with those of Rúben Semedo and Pape Abou Cissé suddenly brought the previously fifth-choice center-back, Ba into the side. This was the opportunity the player needed. After coming into the starting line-up in early December versus Panetolikos, Ba remained there until the season was interrupted by the COVID-19 pandemic. During that stretch, Ba played 16 matches in less than 100 days, participating as a starter in every one of those games.

International career
On 8 March 2020, the 25-year-old central defender was called to the Senegal national team for the first time in his career. Within six months, the African has managed to win a place in Olympiacos squad, play in the Europa League and called for the two upcoming matches for the 2020 African Cup Qualifiers, against Guinea Bissau on 28 and 31 March. He first represented the Senegal national team in a friendly 3-1 loss to Morocco on 9 October 2020.

Career statistics

Club

Honours

Club
Olympiacos 
Super League Greece: 2019–20, 2020–21, 2021–22
Greek Cup: 2019–20 ; runner-up: 2020–21

References

External links

 
 
 

Living people
1995 births
Footballers from Dakar
Association football defenders
Senegalese footballers
Senegal international footballers
Gazélec Ajaccio players
Olympiacos F.C. players
Ligue 2 players
Super League Greece players
Senegalese expatriate footballers
Senegalese expatriate sportspeople in France
Senegalese expatriate sportspeople in Greece
Expatriate footballers in France
Expatriate footballers in Greece